The men's 110 metres hurdles event at the 2003 Asian Athletics Championships was held in Manila, Philippines on September 20–21.

Medalists

Results

Heats
Wind: Heat 1: +1.2 m/s, Heat 2: +1.7 m/s, Heat 3: +0.3 m/s

Final
Wind: -0.7 m/s

References

2003 Asian Athletics Championships
Sprint hurdles at the Asian Athletics Championships